Gynura procumbens (also known as sabuñgai or sambung nyawa), sometimes called "longevity spinach" or "longevity greens", is an edible vine found in China, Southeast Asia, and Africa. The plant grows wild but is also cultivated as a vegetable or medicinal plant. Its young leaves are used for cooking, such as with meat and prawns in a vegetable soup.

References

External links

 Philippine Medicinal Plants, Sabuñgai, Gynura procumbens (Lour.) Merr., LONGEVITY SPINACH Bai bing ca 

procumbens
Flora of Asia
Flora of Africa
Edible plants
Plants described in 1790
Perennial vegetables